= Tarikua Bergena =

Ethiopian footballer

- Citizenship: Ethiopia
- Occupation: GoalKeeper

Tarikua Bergena is a female Goalkeeper from Ethiopia.

In the year 2023, Tarikua Bergena was the keeper for the Women Olympic Football Tournament in Paris, although the Ethiopia Lucy lost to the Nigeria Super falcons on 4-0 (aggregate 5-1).
